Harry Bates may refer to:

Harry Bates (sculptor) (1850–1899), English sculptor
Harry C. Bates (1882–1969), American labor union leader
Harry Bates (footballer) (1890–?), English footballer
Harry Bates (writer) (1900–1981), American science fiction editor and writer
Harry Bates (priest) (1912–1980), English Archdeacon of Lindisfarne
Harry Bates (architect) (1927–2022). American architect
Harry Bates (Coronation Street), fictional character on British television

See also
Harry Bates Thayer (1858–1936), American electrical and telephone businessman
Henry Bates (disambiguation)
Harold Raymond Kingsmill Bates (1916–2006), officer in the British Royal Navy